Camiel Neghli (born 6 November 2001) is a professional footballer who plays for De Graafschap. Born in the Netherlands, he has represented Algeria at youth level.

International career
In May 2022, Neghli was called up to the Algeria under-23 national team for the first time for a friendly match against Palestine.

References

External links
 

2001 births
Living people
People from Ede, Netherlands
Footballers from Gelderland
Algerian footballers
Algeria under-23 international footballers
Dutch footballers
Dutch people of Algerian descent
Association football midfielders
De Graafschap players
Eerste Divisie players